Pearl of the Army is a 1916 American silent film serial directed by Edward José. The Pathé-Astra Film Corp movie was made when many early film studio and film producers in America's first motion picture industry were based in New Jersey's Hudson River towns, particularly Fort Lee. Prints and/or fragments were found in the Dawson Film Find in 1978.

Cast
 Pearl White as Pearl Date
 Ralph Kellard as Captain Ralph Payne
 Marie Wayne as Bertha Bonn
 Theodore Friebus as Major Brent
 William T. Carleton as Colonel Dare (as W.T. Carleton)

Chapter titles
 The Traitor
 Found Guilty
 The Silent Menace
 War Clouds
 Somewhere In Grenada
 Major Brent's Perfidy
 For The Stars and Stripes
 International Diplomacy
 The Monroe Doctrine
 The Silent Army
 A Million Volunteers
 The Foreign Alliance
 Modern Buccaneers
 The Flag Despoiler
 The Colonel's Orderly

References

External links

1916 films
1910s rediscovered films
American silent serial films
American black-and-white films
Films directed by Edward José
Films shot in Fort Lee, New Jersey
Pathé Exchange film serials
Rediscovered American films
1910s American films